The Minnesota Channel is an American free-to-air television channel originating at Twin Cities Public Television.  It features programming related to Minnesota (and some related to Wisconsin and North Dakota), plus coverage of the Minnesota Legislature when in session.  The Minnesota Channel is carried as a digital subchannel on all six member networks of the Minnesota Public Television Association.

History 
In early 2003, TPT began setting aside time on KTCI for the "Minnesota Channel", an evening dedicated to local and regional related programming, frequently produced in partnership with other nonprofit and public service organizations.  The service expanded from one to two evenings in 2004 and, on September 16, 2005, became a new full-time digital channel, tptMN (digital channel 17.2, Comcast (Saint Paul) 243, Comcast (Minneapolis) 202, and Mediacom 102).  The Minnesota Channel was expanded to region wide coverage in Minnesota and North Dakota in February 2008.  In October 2012, the Minnesota Channel changed picture formats from 4:3 to 16:9 widescreen.

Programming 
Since its inception, the MN Channel has co-produced more than 250 programs with more than 100 partner organizations: non-profits, universities, governmental agencies and other public service organizations.

Among the programs broadcast on the MN Channel are several targeting ethnic communities that now call Minnesota and the Twin Cities home and who are generally under-served by commercial media.  Some of these shows are also broadcast on Public-access television cable television channels in the region:

Zona Latina (Latino)
Kev Koom Siab (Hmong)
Geetmala (Hindi)
BelAhdan (Middle Eastern)
Journey to the East (Chinese)
Vietnamese News (Vietnamese)

The network's website features information on programs and partners, plus a regularly-updated blog.

Affiliates

Minnesota
 KTCI (2.2 and 2.6) St. Paul/Minneapolis (Available in HD)
 WDSE (8.4) Duluth / WRPT (31.4) Hibbing
 KAWE (9.6) Bemidji / KAWB (22.6) Brainerd
 KWCM-TV (10.3) Appleton / KSMN (20.3) Worthington/Sioux Falls
 KSMQ-TV (15.4) Austin/Rochester

North Dakota
Prairie Public Television carries Minnesota Channel in North Dakota.

 KGFE (2.3) Grand Forks (Available in HD)
 KBME-TV (3.3) Bismarck
 KWSE (4.3) Williston
 KSRE (6.3) Minot
 KDSE (9.3) Dickinson
 KFME (13.3) Fargo
 KCGE (16.3) Crookston, MN / Grand Forks
 KJRE (19.3) Ellendale
 KMDE (25.3) Devils Lake

References 

Television networks in the United States
Public Broadcasting Service
Public television in the United States
Television channels and stations established in 2003
Television in Minnesota
Television stations in North Dakota
English-language television stations in the United States